Edgars Lūsiņš (born December 25, 1984 in Riga, Soviet Union) is a Latvian ice hockey goaltender, currently playing for Prizma Riga in the Latvian Amateur Championship.

External links

1984 births
Living people
Ice hockey people from Riga
Latvian ice hockey goaltenders
Dinamo Riga players
ASK/Ogre players
HK Riga 2000 players
HK Zemgale players